Vladimir Valerianovich Podvysotsky or Volodymyr Valerianovych Pidvysotskyi (1857, village of Maksymivka, Borznyansky Uyezd, Chernigov Governorate — 22 January 1913, Saint Petersburg) was a  Ukrainian pathologist, endocrinologist, immunologist and microbiologist.

Podvysotsky's father was Valerian Podvysotsky, a professor at the Kazan University. Vladimir attended a school in Geneva. He is considered the founder of the Kiev school of pathology. He taught at the University of Novorossiya before moving to Saint Petersburg (1903) where he presided over the Institute of Experimental Medicine until his death.

Member of the Anatomical Society in Paris (1887). Member of the Imperial Military Medical Academy (1900). Honorary member of the Royal Institute of Experimental Therapy in Frankfurt in 1911.

References 

1857 births
1913 deaths
People from Chernihiv Oblast
People from Borznyansky Uyezd
Pathologists from the Russian Empire
Endocrinologists from the Russian Empire
Immunologists from the Russian Empire
Taras Shevchenko National University of Kyiv alumni
Academic staff of the Taras Shevchenko National University of Kyiv
Academic staff of Odesa University
Corresponding members of academies of sciences
Biologists from the Russian Empire
Burials at Nikolskoe Cemetery